Off the Wall is a 1983 American crime comedy film directed by Rick Friedberg, written by Dick Chudnow, and starring Paul Sorvino, Patrick Cassidy, and Rosanna Arquette.

Plot
A young woman frames two hitchhikers for her crimes. Feeling guilty, she tries to break them out.

Reception
Roger Ebert of the Chicago Sun-Times gave the film 1.5 out of 4 stars, calling it "one of the most lame-brained movies of recent years."

References

External links
 

1983 films
1980s crime comedy films
American crime comedy films
Films scored by Dennis McCarthy
1983 comedy films
Films directed by Rick Friedberg
1980s English-language films
1980s American films
English-language crime comedy films